The 2008 New Mexico Democratic presidential primary took place on February 5, 2008, with 26 national delegates at stake.

On February 12, 2008, counting was officially finished and Hillary Clinton was declared the winner.

Process

Although mass media called New Mexico's nominating contest as a caucus, the format was that of a party-run closed primary. Eligible voters included all registered Democrats as of January 4, 2008. Voting occurred between 12 noon and 7 PM Mountain Standard Time. Absentee ballots were available to any voter and were required to be returned by January 28. Delegates were then apportioned based on the results of the primary at the statewide and Congressional district levels, and were formally elected at district and state conventions in April based on the primary results.

Polls

Results

See also
 2008 Democratic Party presidential primaries
 2008 New Mexico Republican primary

References

New Mexico
2008 New Mexico elections
2008
2008 Super Tuesday